Ronald S. Mangum (born November 14, 1944) is a retired United States Army general officer, author, professor, and lawyer.

Early life and education
Mangum was born in Chicago, Illinois to Roy Oliver and Marjorie Wilma Mangum. He grew up in Park Ridge, Illinois and attended Maine Township High School. Subsequently, he attended Northwestern University, Evanston, Illinois, from which he graduated in three years with a Bachelor of Arts degree in History (1965), and Northwestern University School of Law, from which he graduated with a degree of Juris Doctor (1968). He subsequently attended Norwich University, Northfield, Vermont, where he received Master of Arts degree in diplomacy and military science in 2004, and attended Ilia State University in Tbilisi, Georgia where he received a Doctor of Philosophy (PhD) in International Relations (2020).

Soldier

Mangum retired from the United States Army in November 2004 after 35 years of enlisted and officer service. His last command consisted of three elements: Commanding General, Special Operations Command Korea; Commanding General, United Nations Special Operations Component; and Deputy Commanding General, Combined Unconventional Warfare Task Force. He served in Korea from September 2000 to August 2003.

Previous command assignments included Deputy Division Commander; Assistant Division Commander (Logistics); Commander, 1st Brigade (Battle Command Staff Training); Commander, 4th Brigade (Field Exercise Training); Commander, Battle Projection Group (Battle Command Staff Training); Commander, 1st Battalion, 340th Regiment (Instructor); all in the 85th Division (Training Support). He also served as the Operations Officer (S-3) of the 314th Army Security Agency Battalion, Group Intelligence Officer (S-2) and Commander, Operational Detachment A, 1st Battalion, 12th Special Forces Group (Airborne), Arlington Heights, Illinois.

His military awards include the Distinguished Service Medal, Defense Superior Service Medal, Meritorious Service Medal, Joint Service Commendation Medal, Army Commendation Medal with one silver and two bronze oak leaf clusters, and the Order of Cheong Su (Republic of Korea), among others. His military qualifications include the Ranger Tab, Master Parachutist badges (U.S. and Republic of Korea), Pathfinder Badge, Special Operations Diver badge, Aircrew Badge and Canadian Parachutist badge. General Mangum's military education included the Infantry Officer Basic and Advanced courses, Special Forces Qualification Course, Military Intelligence Officer Advanced Course, Civil Affairs Officer Advanced Course, Engineer Officer Advanced Course, the United States Army Command and General Staff Course, the United States Army War College, Capstone and the Joint General Officer/Flag Officer Warfighters Course. Following his retirement from military service, he became a consultant to the United States Department of Defense and was contracted as a senior advisor to the Georgian Ministry of Defense from 2005 to 2011.

Lawyer
As a practising lawyer, Mangum was admitted to practice before the Supreme Courts of Illinois (1968) and Wisconsin (1985), the United States Tax Court, the United States Supreme Court, the United States Court of Appeals for the Seventh Circuit, the United States District Courts (Northern, Central and Southern Districts of Illinois) and the Federal Trial Bar. Mangum practiced law in Chicago for over 30 years, founding the firm of Mangum, Smietanka & Johnson, L.L.C. He served in several leadership positions in the Illinois State Bar Association and the Chicago Bar Association. In the ISBA he was an assembly delegate (1973–1979) and Chair several committees including State Taxation Section Council (1974–1977); Chair, Standing Committee on Long Range Planning (1983–1985); and Chair, Standing Committee on Legislation (1986–1989). In addition, he was founder and chairman of the Health Care Law section (1983–1988). In the Chicago Bar Association he served at Chairman of the Judicial Evaluation and Reform Committee (1976–1977). He retired from the active practice of law upon re-entering active duty with the United States Army in 2000, but returned to the legal profession in 2011 as the Country Director of the American Bar Association Rule of Law Initiative in Armenia in 2011, where he has been admitted to the Armenian Chamber of Advocates as a licensed foreign attorney.

Educator
Mangum served as a full Professor of National Security Studies from 2005 to 2011 at American Military University and briefly served as Program Director of the National Security Studies Program in 2006. He developed and taught courses in Research Methods in National Security Studies, Concepts of National Security, U.S. National Security, International Security, Diplomacy and National Security and Institutions of National Security.

Philanthropist
Mangum was active in many charitable organizations, especially the modern Knights Templar organization known as the Ordo Supremus Militaris Templi Hierosolymitani (OSMTH) in which he attained the rank of Grand Croix and served as international Grand Chancellor General from 1996 to 2003 and Grand Prior of Austria from 2011.

He helped establish the brotherhood of Tadzrelebi (Templars) in the former Soviet Republic of Georgia in 2008 and served as Preceptor of that group from 2009. He has also been active in the Military and Hospitaller Order of Saint Lazarus of Jerusalem (Grand Croix) (Grand Commander of the Grand Priory of Carpathia), the Order of the Eagle of Georgia and the Seamless Tunic of Our Lord Jesus Christ (Grand Croix), the Order of St. Constantine Magnus (Knight) and Companion of the Order of the Red Branch (Ireland). He has been President of the American Hearing Research Foundation, Trustee of the Evanston (Illinois) Art Center, President of the Parkinson Research Corporation, Life member of the Art Institute of Chicago, and member of the Evanston (Illinois) Preservation Commission.

Armorial Bearings

In 2005, for service rendered the head of the family of Rhedey von Kis-Rhede line of the Saros Country of the Genus Aba of the former Kingdom of Hungary granted perpetual use of one of the coats of arms granted to the Rhedey family in 1578 by King Rudolf of Hungary and Austria at Pressburg, Austria. The arms have been registered with the American College of Heraldry (2007) and the Russian College of Heraldry (2008), and are described as:

On December 5, 2008, Prince Krzysytof Konstanty Radziwill invested General Mangum as a hereditary noble knight of the Polish-Lithuanian Princely House of Radziwill and granted to him and all of his descendants, the right in perpetuity to incorporate into his arms the Arms of the Radziwill Family, described as "Argent three bugle horns in triangle the mouthpieces conjoined in fess point sable garnished, virolled and corded."

Other
Mangum has been featured in several editions of Who's Who including Who's Who in the Midwest (1980–81; 1982–83; 1984–1985); Who's Who in American Law, 1st and 2nd Editions; and Who's Who in America 2012 (66th Edition), as well as in Martindale-Hubbell Bar Register of Pre-eminent Lawyers (1999).

Publications and Appearances

Military publications

Books
 Improving United Nations Peacekeeping Capabilities: Embracing the Possible. MBS Direct, Columbia, MO, May 2005 (electronic version only)

Articles

 “The Development of Civil-Military Relations and National Security Decision Making In Georgia: Authoritarian Transition or State Capture”, unpublished doctoral dissertation, Ilia State University, Tbilisi, Georgia, 24 August 2020
 “Georgian Civil-Military Relations: Hostage to Confrontational Politics” with David Darchiashvili, Caucasus Survey, 5 July 2018
 Podcast: Academic Council on the United Nations System (ACUNS) – Professional Development 14 – Multi-track Careers: Professor Ronald S. Mangum, Special Operations Commander, Lawyer, Digital Professor, 30 April 2014

 Comments on Ukraine-Russia Crisis, Voice of America (VOA) Radio Interview: 4.18.14 
 “Georgia's National Security Review - a truly Whole of Government approach to national security planning". PSS-ISA Joint Conference, Budapest, Hungary, June 2013 

 "Measuring Defense Reform," with Craven, William J., Small Wars Journal, April 26, 2010, www.smallwarsjournal.com
 "Georgia's National Security Review Process", Georgia Today Politics, Issue #453, Tbilisi, Georgia April 3, 2009
 "A National Security Review for Georgia," 24 Saati Online, Tbilisi, Georgia August 4, 2009
 "Georgia's National Security Review Process." Georgia Today Politics, Issue #453, Tbilisi, Georgia, April 4, 2009
 "Models of Regional Security Development: Challenges to Information Sharing", 'Georgia Military Intelligence Department – United States Defense Intelligence Agency, Proceedings of the Symposium on Black Sea and Caspian Sea Security Issues III, Batumi, Georgia, June 12–13, 2008
 "Eliminate the Army Reserve?" Military.com, http://www.military.com/Opinions/0,,Mangum _040805,00.html, April 2005
 "One Step to Solving the Soldier Shortage: Permitting Retired Active Component Members to Join the Reserves." Military.com,  March 7, 2005
 "Linking Conventional and Special Operations Forces." Joint Force Quarterly. Issue 34. Spring 2004. pp. 58–63
 "Perche gli Usa sono andati nei Balcani? (Reviewing US actions in the Balkans)." Intelligence & Storia Top Secret. Issue No. 5, October 2004. pp. 16–17
 "About Those Mountains We Can Bypass North Korea's Maginot Line." USI Journal, United Services Institution of India, March 2004 – August 2004, Vol VI No. 12, pp. 62–68
 "The Development of U.S. Air Power Since September 11: Afghanistan and Beyond: An American View," in Global War on Terrorism, Weapons of Mass Destruction, and North Korea: The Future of Air Power Co-operation, and Korea-US Alliance, The Institute 21 for Peace Studies, The Peace Foundation 21, Seoul, 2004, Chapter 18, pp. 182–193
 "Joint Force Training: Key to ROK Military Transformation." Korea Journal of Defense Analysis, Vol. XVI, No. 1, Spring 2004. Seoul, Korea. March 2004. pp. 119–134
 "North Korea's Maginot Line". Armed Forces Journal (cover story). Washington, DC. November 2003. page 30
 "Joint combat search and rescue." Armed Forces Journal. Washington, DC. December 2002. pp. 16–18
 "NATO's Attack on Serbia – Anomaly or Emerging Doctrine." Parameters, Winter 2000–01, Vol. XXX, No. 4, pp. 40–52.
 "19 Imperativos para el Entramiento de las Fuerzas de Reserva." Military Review. Volume LXXXI, May–June 2001, Number 3, pp. 19–29
 "Training Imperatives for Reserve Forces." Military Review. Volume LXXX. November–December 2000. Number 6, pp. 17–24.
 "Challenges Faced by United Nations Peacekeeping Forces." Ordo Supremus Militaris Templi Hierosolymitani. June 1999, 
 "Linking Simulations to Improve Exercise Training Support", Army Research Development and Acquisition. U.S. Army Acquisition Corps. Fort Belvoir. VA, July–August 1997, pp. 33–34.
 "The Vicksburg Campaign: A Study in Joint Operations." Armed Conflict in Human History. John J. Abbatiello (ed.). American Heritage Custom Publishing. New York, NY, 1997. Pp. 189–196.
 "Battle by Bytes", Army Reserve Magazine. U.S. Army Reserve Command. Atlanta, GA, Spring 1997, Volume 42, Number 4, pg. 21.
 "The Vicksburg Campaign: A Study in Joint Operations", Parameters, U.S. Army War College, Vol. XXI No. 3, Carlisle Barracks, PA, Autumn 1991, pp. 74–86.
 "How to Develop a Training Management Program", Army Trainer, U.S. Army Training and Doctrine Command, Ft. Monroe, VA. Fall 1987, pp. 45–49.

Law publications

Books
 Developing Your Compliance Program – A Survivor's Workbook, Life Services Network of Illinois, Hinsdale, Illinois, 1999.
 Governing Board and Administrator Liability, with Robert M. Hendricksen, prepared by the ERIC Clearinghouse on Higher Education, the George Washington University, American Association for Higher Education, Washington, DC, 1977
 Tax Aspects of Charitable Giving, American Hearing Research Foundation, Chicago, IL, 1976

Book chapters
 "Addressing Key Ethical Issues in the New Synergy of Ethics in Rehabilitation", with Dennis Robbins, Ph.D., Conference Proceedings, The 1995 RehabAlliance, American Hospital Association and American Rehabilitation Association, Washington, DC and Chicago, IL, October 1995
 "Tort Liability of Governing Board Members and Administrative Officers", Topics in Health Care Financing, Summer 1984, Aspen Systems Corp., Gaithersburg, Maryland.

Articles
 "Healing the Health Care System by Putting the Patient in the Center." Connection Magazine, Monthly Journal of the American Chamber of Commerce, Bratislava, Slovakia, November 2004 (http://www.amcham.sk/Public_ConnectionIssue.aspx?id=32).
 "Ten Steps to Developing an Effective Compliance Program." The Administrator's Advocate, Volume 1, Issue 4, September 2000.
 "U.S. Efforts to Stem Health Care Fraud: A study in legalized terror." Academy of Business and Administrative Sciences, Prague, Czech Republic, June 2000. http://www.sba.muohio.edu/abas/2000/FraudABAS.pdf
 "In Search of a Standard: Legal and Ethical Dimensions of American Health Care Reform." Academy of Business and Administrative Sciences, Barcelona, Spain, June 1999. http://www.sba.muohio.edu/abas/1999/mangumro.pdf
 "Ten Steps to Developing an Effective Compliance Program", QUEST – The Journal of the Illinois Health Care Association, Springfield, IL, August 1998.
 "Long Term Care Ethics Issues", with Dennis Robbins, Ph.D., FOCUS, IPCI Limited, Racine, WI, Vol. 22, No. 4, Winter 1995
 "Overtime Wages Under the Enterprise Theory", with Roberto Pulver, Chicago Healthcare, Chicago, IL, September 1994
 "Sexual Harassment in the Workplace", Chicago Healthcare, Chicago, IL, July 1994
 "Advanced Directives Provide Unique Dilemma for Home Care", Chicago Healthcare, Chicago, IL, May 1994
 "HCFA Removes Preferential Add-On Payment to Hospital Based Agencies", Chicago Healthcare, Chicago, IL, April 1994
 "ADA Offers New Challenges to Homecare Industry", Chicago Healthcare, Chicago, IL, February 1994
 "Reform Package Means Prosperity for Home Care", Chicago Healthcare, Chicago, IL, January 1994
 "Pledging Medicare/Medicaid Receivables", HFMA 1st Illinois Chapter Newsletter, March 1984, Chicago, IL
 "Medicare Providers and the Courts", Parts 1 & 2, Chicago Daily Law Bulletin, March 5 & 6, 1982 (Vol. 125, No.'s 44 & 45)
 "Independent Foundations, A Source of Innovation in Healthcare Delivery", Hospital Financial Management, Chicago, IL, October 1981
 "Social Security – Staying Out or Getting Out", HFMA, 1st Illinois Chapter Newsletter, Chicago, IL, March 1981
 "Capital Financing Through Tax Exempt 63-20 Bonds", Illinois Health Care Association Newsletter, December 1980
 "Charitable Transfers and Estate Planning", Thirty-Eight Annual Institute on Federal Taxation, New York University, 1980

See also
 Countess Claudine Rhédey von Kis-Rhéde – for information on the von Kis-Rhéde family
 Samuel Aba, King of Hungary

References

Living people
1944 births
United States Army generals
Recipients of the Defense Superior Service Medal
Recipients of the Distinguished Service Medal (US Army)